Pleasant Hill is a census-designated place (CDP) in Polk County, Texas, United States. This was a new CDP for the 2010 census with a population of 522.

Geography
Pleasant Hill is located at  (31.003253, -94.793584).

Education
It is in the Corrigan-Camden Independent School District, which operates Corrigan-Camden High School.

The Texas Legislature designated Polk County as being in the boundary of Angelina College's district.

References

Census-designated places in Polk County, Texas
Census-designated places in Texas